Leo Armand Paquette ( – January 21, 2019) was an American organic chemist.

Biography
He was born on July 15, 1934 to parents Armand and Clarice with roots in Quebec (great-grandfather Edmund was born in Contrecoeur, Quebec) and he received his B.S. degree from Holy Cross College in 1956 and his Ph.D. in Organic Chemistry from the Massachusetts Institute of Technology in 1959 with Professor Norman Allan Nelson. After serving as a research associate at the Upjohn Company from 1959 to 1963, he joined the faculty of Ohio State University. He was promoted to full professor in 1969 and was named Distinguished University Professor in 1987. Paquette was elected a member of the National Academy of Sciences in 1984, and was the founding editor of the ''Electronic Encyclopedia of Reagents for Organic Synthesis (e-EROS). 
Paquette is perhaps best known for achieving the first total synthesis of the Platonic solid dodecahedrane.

Scientific misconduct

In 1993, an Ohio State University investigation found that Paquette had plagiarized sections from an unfunded NIH grant application, for which he was a reviewer, and included the text in his own NIH grant application. The Office of Research Integrity agreed with the University investigation and "required institutional certification of proper attribution in any future grant proposals" from Paquette and "prohibited him from serving on Public Health Service Advisory Committees, Boards, or review groups" for ten years.

For a separate plagiarism incident that occurred in 1991, the Ohio State University investigatory panel found that Paquette had plagiarized a NSF proposal, that he was also a reviewer for, and included sections in a paper he published in the Journal of the American Chemical Society. The NSF's Office of Inspector General (OIG) found that Paquette knowingly "submitted falsified evidence for the purpose of disproving the misconduct in science charge" and made "false statements under oath in the OIG investigation concerning the authenticity of the evidence". The falsified evidence consisted of a computer disk that included a "'mock draft,' a copy of the paper's final draft that Paquette had marked up to look like an earlier draft" and was back-dated prior to Paquette's review of the NSF proposal and, importantly, prior to the manufacture of the disk. The US Secret Service also found that someone had attempted to erase the lot number of the disk. In 1998, the NSF entered into a binding settlement with Paquette: Paquette would voluntarily exclude himself from any federal funding for two years and the NSF would not "issue a finding of misconduct in science".

Honors

Paquette’s honors include Sloan Fellow, Guggenheim Fellow, ACS Award for Creative Work in Synthetic Organic Chemistry, and the Arthur C. Cope Scholar Award of the ACS.

Books

 Encyclopedia of reagents for organic synthesis, 2009
 Handbook of reagents for organic synthesis, 1999-2007
 Organic Reactions, Editor-In-Chief, Vols. 38-55
 Encyclopedia of reagents for organic synthesis, 1995
 Comprehensive Organic Synthesis: Combining C-C pi-bonds, 1992
 Polyquinane chemistry : syntheses and reactions, 1987 
 Recent synthetic developments in polyquinane chemistry, 1984 
 Organic chemistry, 1979 
 Principles of modern heterocyclic chemistry, 1968

Further reading

See also 
 List of scientific misconduct incidents

References

1934 births
2019 deaths
People from Worcester, Massachusetts
College of the Holy Cross alumni
Massachusetts Institute of Technology School of Science alumni
21st-century American chemists
Ohio State University faculty
Members of the United States National Academy of Sciences
American people of French-Canadian descent